Euryopini is a tribe of leaf beetles in the subfamily Eumolpinae.

Taxonomy
Following the leaf beetle classification of Seeno and Wilcox (1982), the genera of Euryopini are divided into three informal groups or "sections": Colasposomites, Euryopites and Prasoideites.

Genera
These 20 genera belong to the tribe Euryopini:

 Bechyneia Jolivet, 1950
 Cheiridella Jacoby, 1904
 Colasposoma Laporte, 1833
 Eumolpopsis Jacoby, 1894
 Euryope Dalman, 1824
 Lefevrea Jacoby, 1897
 Lucignolo Zoia, 2010
 Melindea Lefèvre, 1884
 Microhermesia Jacoby, 1900
 Obelistes Lefèvre, 1885
 Odontiomorpha Jacoby, 1900
 Odontionopa Chevrolat in Dejean, 1836
 Paracrothinium Chen, 1940
 Pathius Aslam, 1968
 Phascus Lefèvre, 1884
 Platycornia Zoia, 2018
 †Taphioporus Moseyko & Kirejtshuk, 2013
 Thysbina Weise, 1902
 Timentes Selman, 1965
 Trichostola Chapuis, 1874

References

Beetle tribes
Eumolpinae